The Pacific Junior Hockey League (PJHL), formerly Pacific International Junior Hockey League, (PIJHL) until 2012 is a Canadian junior ice hockey league which operates in the Lower mainland of British Columbia.  Although the PJHL has included American teams in the past, the league's thirteen franchises all currently reside in Lower Mainland of BC.   Several National Hockey League stars began their junior hockey careers in the PJHL, but the main focus of the league is player development and education with strong ties to the local hockey community.  The PJHL Championship is awarded annually to the league playoff champion and the winner moves on to compete against the champions of the Kootenay International Junior Hockey League and the Vancouver Island Junior Hockey League for the British Columbia Provincial Title, the Cyclone Taylor Cup. The winner of the Cyclone Taylor Cup moves on to compete for the Western Canada Junior "B" Crown, the Keystone Cup.

History

Early years: 1966-1980

The earliest incarnation of the Pacific Junior Hockey League, the West Coast Junior Hockey League, was founded in 1966, with a total of six teams, including the still-existent Grandview Steelers. Other teams from Chilliwack, Coquitlam, Richmond and Burnaby. These five teams, along with the Nor Wes Caps, contested the first season of play in the new league. The Richmond Juniors were awarded the first ever championship in 1967, but the early years of the league were dominated by the Nor Wes Caps, who won four championships in the first seven seasons in the league. However, in the mid-70s, a number of league teams departed for the Junior 'A' level of hockey, including the Nor Wes Caps. A number of teams would replace the departed, including the North Shore Flames and the Northwest Americans. In the second half of the 1970s, the league championship was continuously handed back and forth between the Richmond Rebels, Burnaby Blazers and the Northwest Americans, before the Blazers and Rebels were forced to relocate.

1980-2000

The first seven seasons of the 1980s were dominated by the North Shore Flames and the Northwest Americans, who combined won all seven league championships in that time (four for the Americans, and three for the Flames). This dominance was ended in 1987 by the Burnaby Bluehawks, who defeated the White Rock Whalers in the league final. White Rock would become champions the following year, defeating the North Shore Flames en route to the title. In 1989, current league members Abbotsford Pilots won their first league title, having relocated from Mission shortly before. A number of previously title-less teams would win the championship in the following years, including the Coquitlam Warriors in 1991, the Richmond Sockeyes in 1992, and the Port Coquitlam Buckeroos in 1995. In 1992, the West Coast Junior Hockey League officially re-branded itself as the Pacific International Junior Hockey League. In 1994, the Grandview Steelers won their first championship since 1968, defeating the Richmond Sockeyes in the league championship. The Port Coquitlam Buckeroos and Ridge Meadows Flames would split the next four championship between them, until the Abbotsford Pilots won in 1998-99, and again in 1999-00 for their second and third championships.

2000-present

The Delta Ice Hawks won their first title in 2000-01, defeating the Buckeroos in five games in the league finals, but lost the finals in four to the Abbotsford Pilots the following season. The next two seasons were won by the Richmond Sockeyes, who defeated Abbotsford and Delta 4-3 and 4-1 respectively for the titles. Abbotsford would defeat Delta in 2004-05 championship final in seven games. However, Delta would defeat those same Pilots the next year in six games. Abbotsford would come back and win the following year, over the Grandview Steelers in the final, which to date remains their last championship. The Pilots would go on to lose in the championship series in four of the next five seasons, to Grandview once, Delta once and Richmond twice. The only year in which the Pilots did not make the final, the Aldergrove Kodiaks won their first title, over the Delta Ice Hawks. In 2012-13, the Richmond Sockeyes won their second title in three years, beating Aldergrove in four games, but the Kodiaks would defeat the Sockeyes the following year to claim their second overall title, in seven games. In 2014-15, the North Vancouver Wolf Pack, formerly the Squamish Wolf Pack, won their first league title, defeating the Mission City Outlaws in the championship. But Mission would win their first league title the following year over the Grandview Steelers in five games.
The Aldergrove Kodiaks won their third overall title in 2017, defeating the Ice Hawks in six games. Delta won their fourth title the following year over the Ridge Meadows Flames in six games. The Wolf Pack won their second overall title, defeating the Langley Trappers in four games in 2019. The PJHL Championship was not awarded for the first time after the 2019-20 season, which was going to be the North Vancouver Wolf Pack and the Aldergrove Kodiaks, due to the coronavirus pandemic. And again after the 2020-21 season.

Teams

On January 26, 2023, Port Coquitlam was announced as a new expansion team to join the league in the 2023-24 season.
 Notes

 An asterisk (*) denotes a franchise move. See the respective team articles for more information.

Champions

Defunct or relocated teams

 Abbotsford Flyers
 Bellingham Blazers
 Burnaby Blazers
 Burnaby Bluehawks
 Burnaby Rams
 Chilliwack Jets
 Coquitlam Chiefs
 Coquitlam Comets
 Coquitlam Warriors
 Cloverdale Cowboys
 Delta Saints
 Delta Sungods
 Hastings Express
 Hope Icebreakers
 Kerrisdale Centennials
 Ladner Rebels
 Langley Knights (to Surrey)
 Maple Ridge Monarchs
 Mission Pilots
 Newton Rangers
 New Westminster Royals
 Nor'Wes Caps
 North Delta Devils 
 North Delta Flyers
 North Shore Junior Canadians
 North Shore Griffins
 North Shore Winter Club Flames
 Northwest Americans
 Point Grey Blades
 Port Coquitlam Buckeroos
 Portland Junior Buckeroos
 Queen's Park Pirates
 Richmond Juniors
 Richmond Junior Islanders
 Richmond Junior Rebels
 Riley Park Rangers
 Seattle Totems
 Seafair Seahorses
 Seafair Islanders
 Squamish Eagles
 Squamish Wolf Pack
 Surrey Stampeders
 Surrey Saints
 University of British Columbia Braves
 Vancouver Hornets
 Vancouver Junior Canucks
 Washington Totems
 White Rock Rangers
 White Rock Whalers

NHL alumni

Karl Alzner
Victor Bartley
Troy Brouwer
Steve Clippingdale
John Craighead
Brenden Dillon
Colton Gillies
Ryan Hollweg
Bracken Kearns
Andrew Ladd
Ben Maxwell
Brandon Yip
Stephen Peat
Brad Hunt
Tony Horacek
Milan Lucic
Sasha Lakovic
Kenndal McArdle
Kyle Turris
Tyler Eckford
Link Gaetz
Colin Fraser
Zach Hamill
Jeff Tambellini
David Van der Gulik
David Jones
David Wilkie
Jason Garrison
Matt Hervey
Dean Malkoc
John Negrin
Mike Santorelli
Raymond Sawada
Brent Seabrook
Brandon Segal
Jordan Sigalet
Rob Skrlac
Trevor Smith
Nick Tarnasky
Devon Toews
Derek Grant
Scott Langkow

References

External links
Official Website of the Pacific Junior Hockey League
PJHL historical standings archive

Ice hockey leagues in British Columbia
B
Sports leagues established in 1965
1965 establishments in British Columbia